Objetos perdidos (also known as Lost Objects) is a comedy show broadcast by Las Estrellas. It started airing on March 20, 2007 and is aired on Tuesday nights. The format is made up of short sketches about the hidden stories behind the lost objects found at a warehouse. It is written in a very Mexican black comedy tone and has a running time of 30 minutes.

Despite the funny stories and the good performances, rumours have circulated since the very beginning of the show about the eventual cancellation due to low ratings.  Despite these rumors, however, Objectos perdidos has also aired on Univision in the United States, among other countries.

Cast 
Enrique Rocha - Narrator
Héctor Sandarti - Various Characters
Roxana Castellanos - Various Characters

External links 
 

Mexican sketch comedy television series
2007 Mexican television series debuts
Las Estrellas original programming